Luangpho Yai, also known as Phra Phutta Rattana Mongkhol Maha Munee, and The Great Buddha of Roi Et, is the fourth-tallest statue in Thailand.

Construction was completed in 1973. It is covered with mosaic and made of concrete. The sculptor was believed to be a local sculptor. The overview of the Buddha was criticised as "not to the ratio" of any ordinary Buddha. It's assumed that the local sculpture focused on his faithful belief rather than the outside beauty.

The statue depicts the Gautama Buddha in a standing pose. The statue stands as the province's landmark, as being cited in the province's official quote; Leu nam phra yai (ลือนามพระใหญ่). The statue was built by the order of the 5th abbot of the Wat Bhurapha Piram temple, Phra Ratcha Preechayana Munee over the course of 8 years at a cost of approximately 7,000,000 baht.

Names

The formal name, Phra Phuttha Rattana Mongkhol Maha Munee (พระพุทธรัตนมงคลมหามุนี), translates to the "Great Buddha, the Precious and Auspicious Sage," from Sanskrit/Pali .

The statue is also known as Luangpho Yai (หลวงพ่อใหญ่) or Luangpho To (หลวงพ่อโต); neither terms refer to any specific Buddha statue. The names literally mean Big Buddha, and are used for any colossal Buddha statue.

See also 
 Other tallest statues in Thailand
 Great Buddha of Thailand, the tallest
 Phuket Big Buddha, the 3rd-tallest
 Luang Pho To Wat Intaravihara, the 4th-tallest

References

External links 

Outdoor sculptures in Thailand
Colossal Buddha statues
Concrete Buddha statues
Statues in Thailand